William Gilthorpe Campbell (February 13, 1908 – February 21, 1973) was a Major League Baseball catcher.

In 295 games over five seasons, Campbell posted a .263 batting average (186-for-708) with 78 runs, 5 home runs, 93 RBI and 116 bases on balls. He finished his major league career with a .975 fielding percentage.

External links

1908 births
1973 deaths
Major League Baseball catchers
Baseball players from Kansas
Sportspeople from Kansas City, Kansas
Cincinnati Reds players
Brooklyn Dodgers players
Chicago Cubs players
Monroe Drillers players
Beaumont Exporters players
Shreveport Sports players
El Dorado Lions players
Memphis Chickasaws players
Los Angeles Angels (minor league) players
Syracuse Chiefs players
Montreal Royals players
Seattle Rainiers players
Louisville Colonels (minor league) players
Oakland Oaks (baseball) players
Portland Beavers players